The 1977 Cincinnati Reds season was a season in American baseball. The team finished in second place in the National League West, with a record of 88–74, 10 games behind the Los Angeles Dodgers. The Reds were managed by Sparky Anderson and played their home games at Riverfront Stadium.

Offseason 
 December 16, 1976: Tony Pérez and Will McEnaney were traded by the Reds to the Montreal Expos for Woodie Fryman and Dale Murray.
 February 13, 1977: Steve Christmas was signed as an amateur free agent by the Reds.
 February 16, 1977: Dave Schneck was traded by the Reds to the Chicago Cubs for Champ Summers.
 March 28, 1977: Joel Youngblood was traded by the Reds to the St. Louis Cardinals for Bill Caudill.

Regular season

Season standings

Record vs. opponents

Notable transactions 
 June 15, 1977: Pat Zachry, Doug Flynn, Steve Henderson, and Dan Norman were traded by the Reds to the New York Mets for Tom Seaver.
 June 15, 1977: Gary Nolan was traded by the Reds to the California Angels for Craig Hendrickson (minors).
 June 15, 1977: Rawly Eastwick was traded by the Reds to the St. Louis Cardinals for Doug Capilla.
 June 15, 1977: Mike Caldwell was traded by the Reds to the Milwaukee Brewers for two minor leaguers.
 September 28, 1977: Rudy Meoli was purchased from the Reds by the Chicago Cubs.

Roster

Player stats

Batting

Starters by position 
Note: Pos = Position; G = Games played; AB = At bats; H = Hits; Avg. = Batting average; HR = Home runs; RBI = Runs batted in

Other batters 
Note: G = Games played; AB = At bats; H = Hits; Avg. = Batting average; HR = Home runs; RBI = Runs batted in

Pitching

Starting pitchers 
Note: G = Games pitched; IP = Innings pitched; W = Wins; L = Losses; ERA = Earned run average; SO = Strikeouts

Other pitchers 
Note: G = Games pitched; IP = Innings pitched; W = Wins; L = Losses; ERA = Earned run average; SO = Strikeouts

Relief pitchers 
Note: G = Games pitched; W = Wins; L = Losses; SV = Saves; ERA = Earned run average; SO = Strikeouts

Awards and records 
 George Foster, MLB Home Run Champion (52)
 George Foster, MLB RBI Champion (149)
 George Foster, National League MVP

All-Stars 
1977 Major League Baseball All-Star Game
 Johnny Bench, starter, catcher
 Joe Morgan, starter, second base
 Dave Concepción, starter, shortstop
 George Foster, starter, outfield
 Tom Seaver, reserve
 Pete Rose, reserve
 Ken Griffey, reserve

Farm system

References

External links 
1977 Cincinnati Reds season at Baseball Reference

Cincinnati Reds seasons
Cincinnati Reds season
Cincinnati Reds